Blue/Orange is a play written by English dramatist, Joe Penhall. The play is a sardonically comic piece which touches on race, mental illness and 21st-century British life.

Productions 
The play premiered in the Cottesloe Theatre at the Royal National Theatre, London beginning previews from 7 April 2000 with an opening night on 13 April, where it ran in repertory until 23 August, starring Bill Nighy as Robert, Andrew Lincoln as Bruce and Chiwetel Ejiofor as Christoper. The production was directed by Roger Michell, designed by William Dudley, lighting by Rick Fisher and sound by Neil Alexander. 

The production transferred to the Duchess Theatre (re-configuring the stalls for an in-the-round setting) in London's West End beginning previews on 24 April 2001, with an opening night on 30 April with Nighy, Lincoln and Ejiofor reprising their roles until 18 August. From 20 August, the second cast featured Shaun Parkes as Christopher, Neil Stuke as Bruce and David Threlfall as Robert until the production closed on 15 December 2001.

In 2007, an audio production of the play was released starring Daniel Davis, Teagle F. Bougere and Matt Letscher.

In 2008, Plain Clothes Theatre Productions toured the show around the South-West. Venues included the Tobacco Factory, Bristol; and Cheltenham Everyman and the Rondo Theatre, Bath.

In 2012 ran at the Theatre Royal, Brighton starring Robert Bathurst, Gerard McCarthy and Oliver Wilson.

A 2016 revival ran at the Young Vic directed by Matthew Xia starred David Haig as Robert, Daniel Kaluuya as Christopher and Luke Norris as Bruce.

A 2019 production ran at the Birmingham Repertory Theatre directed by Daniel Bailey starred Thomas Coombes as Bruce, Richard Lintern as Robert and Ivan Oyik as Christopher. 

A 2021 production will tour Theatre Royal, Bath, Oxford Playhouse and Royal & Derngate, Northampton directed by James Dacre and starring Giles Terera as Robert, Michael Balogun as Christopher and Ralph Davis as Bruce.

Synopsis

Blurb of the published edition:

In a London psychiatric hospital, an enigmatic patient claims to be the son of an African dictator - a story that becomes unnervingly plausible. BLUE/ORANGE is an incendiary tale of race, madness and a Darwinian power struggle at the heart of a dying National Health Service.

Film adaption
In 2005, the play was adapted into a BBC television film directed by Howard Davies starring Brian Cox, John Simm and Shaun Parkes.

Awards and nominations

Notes

References

Further reading

External links
 
 

2000 plays
English plays
Off-Broadway plays
Laurence Olivier Award-winning plays
West End plays
British plays adapted into films